Datuk Dr. Hiew King Cheu (born 1 March 1952) is a Malaysian politician. He currently is a member and deputy president of Parti Gagasan Rakyat Sabah (PGRS) since 2019.

Hiew is formerly the Member of the Sabah State Assembly for the constituency of Luyang, sitting in the assembly for Malaysian Chinese Association (MCA) - Barisan Nasional (BN) after being an independent a while in 2013. From 2008 to 2013 he was the Member of Parliament (MP) for Kota Kinabalu constituency in Sabah, representing the opposition Democratic Action Party (DAP).

Hiew had contested the federal Kota Kinabalu seat in the 2002 by-election and 2004 Malaysian general election losing on each occasion. He won the seat in the 2008 election. In a four-way election, he narrowly defeated Christina Liew of fellow opposition party PKR and Barisan Nasional's Chin Teck Meng. The election was regarded as an unexpected loss by the ruling Barisan Nasional coalition.

Hiew relinquished his federal seat in 2013, instead contesting, and winning, the State Assembly seat of Luyang. In September 2013, he resigned from the DAP to become an independent in the State Assembly due to his defiance of the party in supporting Lajim Ukin over Wilfred Bumburing to be the leader of the opposition in the assembly.

Hiew joined the Malaysian Chinese Association in 2014 after an invitation by the party in June that year. In 2017 while in MCA., he received the datukship award from Sabah governor Juhar Mahiruddin Up to 2018 and the fall of Barisan Nasional governments, he has been a member in Sabah's MCA, the second largest BN component.

In 2019, Hiew had joined Parti Gagasan Rakyat Sabah (PGRS) and was elected its deputy president.

Election results

Honours

Honours of Malaysia
  :
  Commander of the Order of Kinabalu (PGDK) - Datuk (2017)

References 

Living people
1952 births
People from Sabah
Malaysian people of Hakka descent
Malaysian politicians of Chinese descent
Malaysian Chinese Association politicians
Independent politicians in Malaysia
Democratic Action Party (Malaysia) politicians
Members of the Dewan Rakyat
Members of the Sabah State Legislative Assembly
Commanders of the Order of Kinabalu
21st-century Malaysian politicians